Main Roads Western Australia controls the major roads in the state's Gascoyne region. North West Coastal Highway, a north-south route near the coastline, is the main highway the region. A series of main roads connect coastal towns to the highway, and local roads provide additional links and access to the inland portion of the region. Roads are often named after the towns or areas they connect.

North West Coastal Highway and the main roads in the region are important for multiple aspects of the Gascoyne's economy. These include industrial activities,  particularly gold and salt mining; defence purposes; freight movement, including livestock, as there is no deep-water port in the region; and tourist traffic travelling to National Parks, such as Cape Range, Kennedy Range and Mount Augustus, and the World Heritage sites of the Shark Bay and the Ningaloo Marine Park.

Burkett Road

Burkett Road is a main east-west road in Exmouth Gulf near the northern edge of the Gascoyne. It links North West Coastal Highway with Minilya–Exmouth Road.

Coral Bay Road

Coral Bay Road is a main east-west road in the northern Gascoyne, connecting the coastal town of Coral Bay with Minilya–Exmouth Road in Lyndon.

Minilya–Exmouth Road

Minilya–Exmouth Road, also known as Minilya Exmouth Road, is a major north-south road in the northern Gascoyne. From North West Coastal Highway at Minilya, it travels north to Exmouth, and is the main access road to the North West Cape.

Monkey Mia Road

Monkey Mia Road is a main road across Shark Bay's Peron Peninsula in the Gascoyne. From Denham on the west coast of the peninsula, it travels north-east, through the Francois Peron National Park, to Monkey Mia on the east coast. Monkey Mia road is part of the Shark Bay Tourist Way.

North West Coastal Highway

North West Coastal Highway is the main north-south highway through the Gascoyne. It enters the southern edge of the region at Nerren Nerren, and travels north-west to Carnarvon. The highway continues north, parallel to but inland from the coastline, passing through Minilya. The highway leaves the Gascoyne at Exmouth Gulf, continuing north-east into the Pilbara region. The other major roads in the region are all connected to the highway, either directly or via another main road.

Robinson Street

Robinson Street is a major urban road in the Gascoyne town of Carnarvon. From the centre of town, it travels north-east to North West Coastal Highway at a T junction. It is the western leg of the intersection, with North West Coastal Highway forming the southern leg (towards Geraldton) and the eastern leg (towards Karratha).

Shark Bay Road

Shark Bay Road is a main road in the Gascoyne, providing access to the Shark Bay area. From the Overlander Roadhouse on North West Coastal Highway in Hamelin Pool, it travels west and then north-west up the Peron Peninsula to Denham. Shark Bay Road is part of the Shark Bay Tourist Way, and was previously named Denham Hamelin Road.

See also

 List of highways in Western Australia
 List of road routes in Western Australia
 List of major roads in rural Western Australia
 Major roads in the Kimberley region of Western Australia
 Major roads in the Mid West region of Western Australia
 Major roads in the Pilbara region of Western Australia
 Major roads in the Wheatbelt region of Western Australia
 Tourist Drives in Western Australia

References

Gascoyne
Roads